Jan Gunnarsson and Joakim Nyström were the defending champions, but Nyström did not compete in this year. Gunnarsson teamed up with Mats Wilander and lost in the quarterfinals to Brett Dickinson and Roberto Saad.

Javier Frana and Christian Miniussi won the title by defeating Javier Frana and Christian Miniussi 6–1, 6–2 in the final.

Seeds
The first four seeds received a bye to the second round.

Draw

Finals

Top half

Bottom half

References

External links
 Official results archive (ATP)
 Official results archive (ITF)

1987 Grand Prix (tennis)